Zeyd Ahsen-Böre (also Zeud - Tatar: Зәет Әхсән Бүре, Zäyet Äxsän Büre; 9 December 1920 – 28 August 1984) was a Finnish ice hockey player. He began his career with TBK Tampere in 1942, and remained with the team until 1946. His brothers, Feyzi, Murat, and Vasif were also hockey players. Their father was the Tatar businessman Zinnetullah Ahsen Böre. Zeyd Ahsen-Böre died in Linghem, Östergötland County, Sweden on 28 August 1984, at the age of 63.

Career statistics

References

1920 births
1984 deaths
Finnish ice hockey players
Finnish people of Tatar descent
Ice hockey people from Tampere
Tappara players